Joy Mogensen (born 11 August 1980) is a Danish social democratic politician who served as Minister of Culture and Church from 2019 to 2021.

She was born in Toronto, Ontario, Canada, and is educated at Roskilde University. She served as mayor of Roskilde Municipality from 2011 to 2019. She was appointed Minister for Culture and Church in the Frederiksen Cabinet from 27 June 2019. In August 2021, she stepped down as minister.

References

External links
 

1980 births
Living people
Politicians from Toronto
Danish Culture Ministers
Social Democrats (Denmark) politicians
21st-century Danish politicians
21st-century Danish women politicians
Women government ministers of Denmark
Women mayors of places in Denmark
Roskilde University alumni
People from Roskilde